Malvern Hill stands on the north bank of the James River in Henrico County, Virginia, USA, about eighteen miles southeast of Richmond. On 1 July 1862, it was the scene of the Battle of Malvern Hill, one of the Seven Days Battles of the American Civil War.

The name referred primarily to the house built by Thomas Cocke in the 17th century, which remained in his family for many years. It was named after the Malvern Hills in England. The historic home was gutted by a fire in 1905 and all that now remains are end gables, including a fireplace.  Nevertheless, the ruins are architecturally significant as the remains of one of few known cruciform design houses in Virginia. "The one surviving chimney is perhaps the finest example of seventeenth century diaper brickwork in the state."

The home site figured in three wars.  Lafayette camped there twice in 1781 during the American Revolutionary War. Virginia militia also camped there in the War of 1812. However,  it is best known as the site of bloody American Civil War Battle of Malvern Hill in 1862.

In August 2016, the 871-acre Malvern Hill Farm was listed for sale for $10.6 million by the descendants of William H. Ferguson Sr. (1885–1984). It was purchased by the non-profit Capital Region Land Conservancy (CRLC) in February 2018 for $6.6 million. CRLC subsequently recorded conservation easements to protect 465 acres with the Virginia Department of Historic Resources and 25 acres with the Virginia Outdoors Foundation. Portions of the property were then gifted to Henrico County for the future site of an open space area for education and passive recreation as well as the James River Association for a canoe/kayak launch into Turkey Island Creek that flows into the James River at Presquile National Wildlife Refuge. Capital Region Land Conservancy is holding the remaining 380 acres to be included into the National Park Service Richmond National Battlefield Park.

References

External links 
Malvern Hill — information, with photographs, from the Henrico County Historical Society
"Interpretation Update: Archeological Success at Malvern Hill" — The Richmond National Parks Newsletter 6 (2001)
Malvern Hill, State Route 156 vicinity, Richmond, Independent City, VA at the Historic American Buildings Survey (HABS)
Malvern Hill — a poem by Herman Melville.

Georgian architecture in Virginia
Houses on the National Register of Historic Places in Virginia
Houses in Henrico County, Virginia
National Register of Historic Places in Henrico County, Virginia
Historic American Buildings Survey in Virginia